The Ilston Book is the earliest record of a Baptist church in Wales. It is named after the location of a Baptist meeting place near the ruins of the old Trinity well, the site of a pre-Reformation chapel, at Ilston Beck in Gower near Swansea.

Foundation of the chapel

This "Cromwellian" church was founded in 1649 during the English Civil War under the Calvinistic leadership of John Myles (aka John Miles) (1621–1683).  Thus this earliest Welsh Baptist church stood in the Particular Baptist tradition.

Transfer of the Book to Massachusetts

In 1663 Myles took the Ilston Book with him when he and the whole congregation emigrated to North America, where they settled in a town they named Swansea, Massachusetts, and they founded the First Baptist Church in Swansea.

Brown University

The Ilston Book is held in the Library of Brown University at Providence, Rhode Island, but is not open to public view.

The full list of 261 members up to 1660 is recorded, and shows that they travelled from a wide geographical area in South Wales.

References 
 The Ilston Book : earliest register of Welsh Baptists / transcribed and edited by B.G. Owens (1996) Aberystwyth : National Library of Wales. .
 Henry Melville King, Rev. John Myles and the Founding of the First Baptist Church in Massachusetts (Providence, RI: Preston & Rounds, Co. 1905).
 Gwent, Mervyn & Evans, Evan, A portrait of Gower, Swansea : Royal Institution of South Wales; Gower Society, 1952 — has a chapter about Ilston Beck, John Myles and the Ilston Book.
Baptists in Early North America, Vol. 1, Swansea, MA, William Brackney with Charles Hartman; Mercer University Press, 2013

External links

History of Christianity in Wales
Gower Peninsula
Welsh manuscripts
Baptist Christianity in Wales